Bashkir literature is the literature of the Republic of Bashkortostan, part of Russia.

References

Bashkir-language mass media
Turkic literature